Cuchumbaya District is one of six districts of the province Mariscal Nieto in Peru.

Places of interest 
 Tixani

References